Ruchita Prasad is an Indian actress who has appeared in Kannada, Malayalam, Tamil and Telugu language films in the 1990s and early 2000s.

Career
Ruchita began her career as a model, first competing in the Princess of Indira Nagar Club contest. She began to take modelling seriously and subsequently won the Miss Bangalore beauty pageant in 1995.

Ruchita started her acting career through the unreleased Tamil film Kanden Seethaiyai starring Kamal Haasan and Ramesh Aravind. Ruchita cleared several rounds of auditions and had started shooting for her part, but the film was later dropped after the director and lead actors fell out. She subsequently first appeared in Rangoli in Kannada, before playing a dual role in her first Telugu film, Jabilamma Pelli (1996) opposite Jagapati Babu.

She eventually made her first appearance in a Tamil film through the romantic drama Kannodu Kanbathellam (1999), featuring in an ensemble cast including Arjun, Sonali Bendre and Suchindra Bali. In the late 1990s, Ruchita became one of the first Indian actresses to call out directors regarding casting couch practices.

In 2002, she signed on to appear in a Hindi film directed by M. F. Husain with music by A. R. Rahman, but the project did not develop. By 2004, Ruchita had worked on over 500 commercials and in all four regional film industries.

Filmography

References

External links 
 

Living people
Actresses in Tamil cinema
Actresses in Kannada cinema
Actresses in Malayalam cinema
Actresses in Telugu cinema
20th-century Indian actresses
21st-century Indian actresses
Indian film actresses
Actresses from Bangalore
Female models from Bangalore
Indian beauty pageant winners
Female models from Karnataka
Year of birth missing (living people)